= Trichopeltina =

Scientific classification
- Kingdom: Fungi
- Division: Ascomycota
- Class: Dothideomycetes
- Order: incertae sedis
- Family: Trichopeltinaceae
- Genus: Trichopeltina Theiss.

Type species
- Trichopeltina labecula (Mont.) Theiss.

Genus of fungi

Trichopeltina is a genus of fungi in the Trichopeltinaceae family; according to the 2007 Outline of Ascomycota, the placement in this family is uncertain.

== Species ==
As accepted by Species Fungorum;

- Trichopeltina asiatica Hongsanan & K.D. Hyde (2014)
- Trichopeltina chilensis (Speg.) Theiss. (1913)
- Trichopeltina exporrecta Dilcher (1965)
- Trichopeltina ixorae Bat. & Peres (1967)
- Trichopeltina labecula (Mont.) Theiss. (1914)
